Besarion Gochashvili (born February 6, 1983 in Tbilisi) is a male freestyle wrestler from Georgia. He participated in Men's freestyle 55 kg at 2008 Summer Olympics. After beating Romanian Petru Toarca he lost with Henry Cejudo. In the repechage round he was eliminated by Radoslav Velikov.

External links
 Wrestler bio on beijing2008.com
 

Living people
1983 births
Olympic wrestlers of Georgia (country)
Wrestlers at the 2008 Summer Olympics
Male sport wrestlers from Georgia (country)
Sportspeople from Tbilisi